The East India Company College, or East India College, was an educational establishment situated at Hailey, Hertfordshire, nineteen miles north of London, founded in 1806 to train "writers" (administrators) for the Honourable East India Company (HEIC). It provided general and vocational education for young gentlemen of sixteen to eighteen years old, who were nominated by the Company's directors to writerships in its overseas civil service. The college's counterpart for the training of officers for the company's Presidency armies was Addiscombe Military Seminary, Surrey.

The HEIC was nationalised and the college closed in 1858, becoming a public school with continuing ties to the former college.  The college buildings survive and are now occupied by the public school's successor, Haileybury and Imperial Service College, a private school.

History
Charles Grant, Chairman of the British East India Company and a Member of Parliament (MP), was closely involved in the foundation of the college. It was first located in Hertford Castle but it was evident that a purpose-built seat of learning would be more suitable and in October 1805 the company purchased an estate just outside Hertford Heath for the sum of £5,930 for this objective. The foundation stone of the new buildings were laid on 12 May 1806. The buildings cost the East India Company £92,000 at the time of their erection to the designs of the architect William Wilkins (who later designed the National Gallery in London). The grounds were landscaped by Humphry Repton, his most notable work here being the terraced area to the front of Wilkins' main range and ponds to the west of this. Repton submitted his final account for work undertaken here just eight days before a carriage accident which left him crippled. The new buildings were occupied by students in 1809.

The East India Company had been incorporated in 1600 as a commercial entity. For two hundred years its administrators had been recruited, largely by patronage, to oversee commercial transactions in Asia. By 1800 they had become the de facto government for millions of people in those areas, but without much training for the role. The college was intended to address these shortcomings. In fifty years it trained over two thousand so-called "writers" to administer the Indian subcontinent.

The curriculum was wide, detailed, and targeted to the career responsibilities. It included political economy, history, mathematics, natural philosophy, classics, law and humanity and philology. Languages included Arabic, Urdu (Hindustani), Bengali, Marathi, Sanskrit, Telugu and Persian. Among the tutors were some of the finest minds of the day, many from Oxford and Cambridge, with lavish annual salaries as much as £500.

The college was customarily referred to as "Haileybury" in contemporary accounts, debates in the House of Lords and the House of Commons and by the administrators of the East India Company and the Colonial Civil Service. From 1839 the College had a journal known as the Haileybury Observer.

The East India Company itself was seen as too powerful. There was pressure for meritocracy to replace recruitment by patronage. Graduates of universities in Great Britain should have the chance to serve in India, without needing to pass through the college. In 1855, Parliament passed an act "to relieve the East India Company from the obligation to maintain the College at Haileybury". King's College, London, hosted the first open competitive examinations for appointment to the Indian Civil Service.

Closure and later use of buildings
In the aftermath of the Indian Mutiny of 1857, and in anticipation of the winding-up of the affairs of the East India Company itself, the college was closed in January 1858.  This left the puzzle of what to do with the imposing buildings. For a brief period, they became a military depot for troops destined for India, and during this interregnum the college's Master, Henry Melvill, and Registrar, the Reverend James William Lucas Heaviside, continued to live in their residences on the site and oversaw the maintenance of the buildings. In 1861, the estate was sold at public auction, when it was bought by the British Land Company for £15,000.

A Hertford publisher, Stephen Austin, who had been the official printer to the East India Company’s College and had thus become one of the leading printers of books in various Oriental languages, led a campaign to ensure the buildings were returned to some sort of academic purpose, and in 1862 the site reopened as the public school Haileybury College. This was formally constituted by a royal charter dated 30 August 1864. During the Victorian era, the difference between the two periods of education on the site was referred to as "Old Haileybury" and "New Haileybury".

In its early years, the new Haileybury College retained close links to those involved in colonial administration, and in 1942 it merged with the struggling Imperial Service College to become Haileybury and Imperial Service College.

Administrators

Principals
The college had four principals:
1806–1815: Samuel Henley 
1815–1837: Joseph Batten 
1837–1843: Charles Webb Le Bas
1844–1858: Henry Melvill, afterwards Canon of St. Paul's

Deans
The position of dean was filled by one of the professors:
1813: William Dealtry, MA
1814–1838: Charles Webb Le Bas, MA
1838–1850: James Amiraux Jeremie (Professor of Classics)
1850–1857: W. E. Buckley

Registrars
The position of registrar was filled by one of the professors: 
1813: William Dealtry
1814–1816: Bewick Bridge
1816–1830: Edward Lewton
1831–1834: Henry George Keene
1834–1837: James Michael
1838–1857: Fred Smith

Professors

Languages
Alexander Hamilton taught Sanskrit and Bengali (1806–18).
Charles Stewart taught Hindustani (Urdu) and Persian (1806–). 
Graves Chamney Haughton (1817–27) FRS previously of Fort William College, Calcutta, taught Hindustani, Persian, Arabic, Bengali and Sanskrit.
Francis Johnson taught Sanskrit, Bengali and Telugu (1824–55).
Mirza Muhammed Ibrahim, a Persian, held a permanent appointment as a professor of Arabic and Persian (1826–44)
Monier Monier-Williams taught Sanskrit, Bengali and Telugu (1844–58).
Edward Backhouse Eastwick was Professor of Hindustani, Hindi and Marathi (1845–57).
Major J. W. J.Ouseley, Professor of Persian and Arabic (previously Professor of the Arabic and Persian Languages in the College of Fort-William, Calcutta) (1844–57)

Law
Edward Christian (1806–18)
James Mackintosh was Professor of Law and General Politics 1818–24.
William Empson, was Professor of Law (1824–52).
John Farley Leith QC (1872–80), later Member of Parliament for Aberdeen

Political Economy
Thomas Malthus taught from 1805–34.
Richard Jones was Professor of History and Political Economy (1834–55).
The Rt Hon Sir James Stephen also taught political economy (1855–57)

Mathematics and Natural Philosophy
William Dealtry was Professor of Mathematics 1806–13. He had been Second Wrangler in 1796.
Bewick Bridge (1767–1833) was Professor of Mathematics 1806–16.
Charles Webb Le Bas (1813–37)
Charles Babbage applied unsuccessfully for a job in 1816.
Henry Walter (1816–30)
William Sturgeon lectured on science in 1824.
Frederick Smith (1831–50) of Peterhouse, Cambridge
J. W. L. Heaviside (1838–57) previously of Trinity College, and then Sidney Sussex College, Cambridge, where he graduated Second Wrangler and a Smith's Prize winner in 1830, and tutored until he moved to Haileybury.

Classical and General Literature
Edward Lewton (1806–30)
Joseph Hallett Batten (1806–15)
James Amiraux Jeremie (also Dean) (1830–50), elected in 1850 Regius Professor of Divinity at Cambridge.
 W. E. Buckley (1850–57) previously tutor and fellow at Brasenose College, Oxford and Professor of Anglo-Saxon at Oxford (1844–50), and a member and subsequently vice-president of the Roxburghe Club.

Other
Henry George Keene, who served at the Battle of Seringapatam with the first Lord Harris (his uncle), and whose American wife, though she came of a New England family, was related to Lord Cornwallis. His son became a Fellow of the University of Calcutta and a prolific writer.
Horace Hayman Wilson, Examiner in Sanskrit (1837–57)

Assistants in the Oriental Department included Maulavi Abdal Aly (1809–12), Maulavi Mirza Khedel (1809–19), The Revd. Robert Anderson (1820–25), and David Shea (1826–36). Moonshy Ghoolam Hyder and Thomas Medland taught oriental writing.

Notable alumni
 Sir Edward Colebrooke, 4th Baronet
 John Russell Colvin
 Ashley Eden
 Henry Bartle Frere
 John Peter Grant
 Sir John Lawrence
 James Thomason
 Charles Merivale
 Monier Monier-Williams
 John Muir (indologist)
 Sir William Muir
 Richard Paternoster
 Charles Pelham Villiers
 Sir Richard Temple, 1st Baronet
 Charles Trevelyan
 Charles John Wingfield
 Allan Octavian Hume

References

Further reading

External links
 Death record of Joseph Batten
 Persian Professor in Britain: Mirza Muhammed Ibrahim at the East India Company's College, 1826–1844 by Michael H. Fisher
 
 

1806 establishments in England
Defunct schools in Hertfordshire
British East India Company
History of Hertfordshire
Properties of the East India Company
Educational institutions established in 1806
Educational institutions disestablished in 1858
1850s disestablishments in England